"Hit and Run Lover" is the first song on Fragile, their seventh studio and final album from the dance music band Dead or Alive. Like the 1990 album Fan the Flame (Part 1), it was released only in Japan, where the band were very popular. The song was a hit record for the group, peaking at #2 on the Japanese charts.

A remix of the song was included on Unbreakable: The Fragile Remixes (2001). The new version was performed live at the Tokyo BigSite during an Avex rave concert in 2001, with two new members, Cliff Slapher and Mickey Dee, and without Jason Alburey.

Chart performance

Dead or Alive (band) songs
2000 singles
2000 songs
Avex Trax singles